was the twenty-seventh of the fifty-three stations of the Tōkaidō, making it the center of the route. It is located in what is now the center of the city of Fukuroi, Shizuoka Prefecture, Japan.

History
Fukuroi-juku was developed later than most of the other post stations, as it was not established until 1616. It is 9.7 km from Kakegawa-juku, the preceding post town. At its peak, Fukuroi-juku was home to 195 buildings, including three honjin and 50 hatago. Its total population was approximately 843 people.

Because it was in the vicinity of the former Tōtōmi Province's three major temples, it also flourished as the gateway to the three temples. The three temples were: Hattasan Sonei-ji (法多山尊永寺), Kasuisai (可睡斎) and Yusan-ji (油山寺).

The classic ukiyo-e print by Andō Hiroshige (Hōeidō edition) from 1831–1834 depicts a couple of travelers sheltering at a wayside lean-to, in front of which a woman stirs a large kettle hung from the branch of a large tree. The surrounding area appears to be featureless rice fields, with little indication of a post town.

Neighboring post towns
Tōkaidō
Kakegawa-juku - Fukuroi-juku - Mitsuke-juku

Further reading
Carey, Patrick. Rediscovering the Old Tokaido:In the Footsteps of Hiroshige. Global Books UK (2000). 
Chiba, Reiko. Hiroshige's Tokaido in Prints and Poetry. Tuttle. (1982) 
Taganau, Jilly. The Tokaido Road: Travelling and Representation in Edo and Meiji Japan. RoutledgeCurzon (2004).

References

Stations of the Tōkaidō
Stations of the Tōkaidō in Shizuoka Prefecture